James Henry Kuhl (27 September 1925 – 8 May 2017) was an Australian rules footballer who played with North Melbourne.

Sources

 Holmesby, Russell & Main, Jim (2007). The Encyclopedia of AFL Footballers. 7th ed. Melbourne: Bas Publishing.

External links
 

1925 births
Australian rules footballers from Victoria (Australia)
North Melbourne Football Club players
Geelong West Football Club players
2017 deaths